The 2003 Copeland Borough Council election took place on 1 May 2003 to elect members of Copeland Borough Council in Cumbria, England. The whole council was up for election and the Labour Party stayed in overall control of the council.

Election result

3 Conservative candidates were unopposed.

Ward results

References

2003 English local elections
2003
2000s in Cumbria